Breach (Major Tim Zanetti) is a fictional superhero published by DC Comics. He first appeared in Breach #1 (March 2005) and was created by Bob Harras and Marcos Martin.

Publication history
Breach was originally intended to be a reboot of Captain Atom, until management at DC decided not to revise the character, who was last rebooted during the late 1980s. With the development of Breach already underway, the decision was made to partially rewrite the plot and characters and create a brand new superhero. Evidence of the change remains in the first issue, where the protagonist, Major Zanetti, is called "Major Adams" twice.

Fictional character biography
Breach is a 2005 comic book series from DC Comics. written by Bob Harras with art by penciller Marcos Martin and inker Alvaro Lopez. The series is centered on a US Army Major named Tim Zanetti, who gains superpowers in a scientific experiment gone wrong. Zanetti was working for "Project Otherside", a secret sub-Arctic nuclear reactor where scientists are probing other dimensions. In an accident at the facility, Zanetti is caught in a dimensional rift and afterwards is found in a coma with his body forever changed. His body is placed in an isolation chamber for the next twenty years, at which point he awakens. His body has become a conductor for a mysterious and deadly energy, able to "melt" biological substances with only a touch, and so he has to be dampened with a special containment suit. Left behind while Zanetti is comatose and presumed dead are his wife Helen and son Tate.

Like Captain Atom before him, Zanetti wakes years after the experiment which transformed him. He discovers that his former colleague, Major Mac McClellan, has taken his place in his former family, marrying Helen, and has risen in the military to the rank of General. For some still unknown reasons he decides to tell Zanetti that his family had died the very moment he came to contact with the rift. MacClellan plans to use Zanetti, now dubbed "Breach", as a tool against invasion by the race of transdimensional creatures called the Rifters.

The Rifters are creatures from the far side of the dimensional rift that created Breach. They need to inhabit and take over human bodies in order to take a physical form. Once in human form, they also possess the same deadly attributes of Breach himself, but are totally enslaved by their natural instincts. The declared goal of the Rifters is the global destruction of what they refer to as "the weak ones", the humans, and a particular Rifter agent, Jakob Kekana.

Kekana was a young herdsman in Africa when he was possessed and deformed by a Rifter. Now known simply as The Herdsman, he has been sent to track down Zanetti and probe him to discover why he is not bound to the parasitic Rifter mind. He has acquired an unsurpassed power, strong enough to take down even Superman. For still mysterious reasons, Talia al Ghul is helping the Herdsman, who far from considers her a "weak one".

Breach distances itself from the standard superhero formula by focusing on the tragedy, rather than the triumph, of its title character. Constantly driven to the verge of madness by the Rifter infection in his body and mind, Breach holds onto the memories of his family to keep him sane. This binds him to a strict moral code that, for example, has stopped him from killing two Rifters that possessed innocent children.

Breach has tangled with the Kobra organization and has met up with members of the JLA, including fights with Superman on more than one occasion.

End
Breach was cancelled by DC and the eleventh and final issue was released in November 2005.

The Infinite Crisis limited series revealed that if the Multiverse had survived up to the present, Zanetti would have been a native of Earth-Eight as its version of Captain Atom. Breach escapes from imprisonment by Alexander Luthor. In issue #7 of the series, he joins a makeshift army of heroes defending Metropolis from the dozens of members of the Secret Society of Supervillains. Breach is seen battling the evil construct Amazo. Soon later, Superboy-Prime ruptures Zanetti's containment suit and apparently kills him. The resulting explosion appears to kill the superheroine Looker and the superhero Technocrat as well, but Looker was later revealed to have survived thanks to her telekinesis. Upon Breach's detonation, Captain Atom materializes in the position where Breach had been.

Countdown: Arena #2 depicts a supposedly new Breach, suggested to exist on the new Earth-8, also known as Angor. In Countdown: Arena #4 however, Monarch reveals that he found a brain-dead Breach floating in the Quantum Dimension from which Captain Atom's powers derive after the events of Infinite Crisis, and rebuilt his consciousness to serve him. Breach eventually broke free of Monarch's control, only to be killed by him.

During the events of Blackest Night, Breach is reanimated as a member of the Black Lantern Corps along with the other heroes killed by Superboy-Prime and head for Earth Prime to torment him. Superboy-Prime destroys them by using the black ring cycling through the power set of emotions resulting in a burst of colored energy that destroys Black Lanterns.

Tim Zanetti Jr., son of Tim Zanetti, some time later joins the military-funded Project 7734, under the command of General Sam Lane, upon discovering a subproject aptly named Project Breach, dealing with a powerful weapon, a planet breaker. Project Breach however is soon revealed to be a red herring, or rather an example of the twisted logic of Sam Lane: the planet breaker is an amnesiac, brain-dead Captain Atom, now paralleling Breach both as secret origins, and as final fate.

Powers and abilities
Breach possesses vast super-strength, flight, energy blasts, minor atomic transmutation and huge atomic absorption, he is able to "melt" biological substances only with a touch.

References

External links
DCU Guide

Comics characters introduced in 2005
2005 comics debuts
DC Comics titles
DC Comics male superheroes
DC Comics military personnel
DC Comics characters with superhuman strength
Fictional majors
DC Comics metahumans